Jujubinus poppei is a species of sea snail, a marine gastropod mollusk in the family Trochidae, the top snails.

Description
The height of the shell attains 3.5 mm.

Distribution
This species occurs in the Atlantic Ocean off the Canary Islands.

References

 Couthouy J. P., 1838: Descriptions of new species of Mollusca and shells, and remarks on several Polypii, found in Massachusetts Bay; Boston Journal of Natural History 2 (1): 53–111, pl. 1–3
 Curini Galletti M. (1985). Taxonomic notes on Trochidae: two new species of Jujubinus from the Canary Islands. Basteria 49: 133–144

External links
 

poppei
Gastropods described in 1985